The Smurfs is a Belgian computer-animated television series developed by Dupuis Audiovisuel, IMPS, and Peyo Productions, in association with KiKA, Ketnet, RTBF and Dargaud Media, with the participation of TF1. It is the third television show based on the Belgian comic franchise of the same name, created by Peyo, after the 1961 series and the 1981 series of the same name.

The series was almost entirely produced in Belgium, with 75% of the animation completed at Dupuis' DreamWall animation studio in the city of Charleroi. Its CGI animation style is mainly based on the film Smurfs: The Lost Village and serves as a stand-alone sequel to the film. 

The show was announced by Peyo Productions in 2017. The next year, its European broadcasters were announced: Ketnet (Flanders), TF1 (France), KiKA (Germany), and La Trois (Wallonia). In 2020, it was reported that the broadcast rights had been picked up by the American entertainment brand Nickelodeon for several of its channels, but the airing agreement does not extend to the original 1980s Smurfs series (which continues to be distributed by Warner Bros. in North America).

After 18 months on pay-TV, The Smurfs will stream on Netflix in the United States and abroad. The series made its world premiere on April 18, 2021, on the La Trois channel in Belgium.

A second season was announced in February 2022, premiering worldwide on July 18, 2022 in the United States. In Belgium, it premiered on August 29, 2022 on OUFtivi. In France, it premiered on October 5, 2022 on TFOU.

Voice cast

Original French voices
 Jean-Loup Horwitz as Papa Smurf
 Anna Ramade as Smurfette and Smurfblossom
 Antoine Schoumsky as Brainy Smurf and Poet Smurf
 Marc Arnaud as Hefty Smurf, Greedy Smurf and Wild Smurf
 Kaycie Chase as Jokey Smurf, Smurflily, Baby Smurf and Harmony Smurf
 Jérémy Prévost as Vanity Smurf, Farmer Smurf and Dimwitty Smurf
 Fanny Bloc as Clumsy Smurf, Smurfstorm and Smurfbegonia
 Xavier Fagnon as Handy Smurf and Reporter Smurf
 Magali Rosenzweig as Smurfwillow, Lazy Smurf, Scaredy Smurf and Leaf
 Emmanuel Curtil as Gargamel, Grouchy Smurf and Chef Smurf

English dub voices
Davis Freeman as Papa Smurf, Farmer Smurf, and Drummer Smurf
Bérangére McNeese as Smurfette and Baby Smurf (episode 2-23)
Youssef El Kaouakibi as Brainy Smurf
Lenny Mark Irons as Gargamel, Dimwitty Smurf, Bigmouth, Reporter Smurf, Harmony Smurf, Doctor Smurf, and Forgotten Smurf
Catherine Hershey as Willow
Ilse La Monaca as Greedy Smurf
Tess Bryant as Clumsy Smurf, Scaredy Smurf,  and Mummy
Daniel Sieteiglesias as Vanity Smurf
Joshua Rubin as Handy Smurf and Grouchy Smurf
Vincent Broes as Hefty Smurf and Chef Smurf
Kaycie Chase as Jokey Smurf, Baby Smurf (episode 28-present) and Wimpy Smurf
Sandra Asratian as Lazy Smurf
Lawrence Sheldon as Poet Smurf and Painter Smurf (Season 1)
Jackie Jones as Smurflily
Cherise Silvestri as Azrael
Magali Rosenzweig as Smurfstorm
Anna Ramade as Smurfblossom
Charlie Cattrall as Tailor Smurf
Luke Calzonetti as Wild Smurf
Jade Wheeler as Leaf
Madeleine Fletcher as Painter Smurf (Season 2-present), Timid Smurf and Gleeko
Arianna D'Amato as Smurfbegonia

Series overview

Broadcast
It originally premiered in Belgium on April 18, 2021 on La Trois (the RTBF channel), during the OUFtivi programming block. 

In Switzerland, the series premiered on April 25, 2021 on RTS Un, during the RTS Kids programming block.

In France, the series premiered on May 9, 2021 on the TFOU programming block on TF1.
And in Québec from August 28, 2021 in Télé-Québec, under the title Les Schtroumpfs 3D., later premiered on Nickelodeon France on January 2, 2023.

In the United States, the series debuted on Nickelodeon on September 10, 2021. 

In Germany, the series premiered on KiKa on April 16, 2022.

In the United Kingdom, the show premiered on November 1, 2021 on Nicktoons, with the same English dub.

In Latin America, the series first premiered on streaming Paramount+ on November 1, 2021, then the series premiered on Nickelodeon on November 26, 2021 as an exclusive preview until it officially premiered on February 5, 2022.

The Indonesian-dubbed version currently airs on RTV since May 2022. The Bengali-dubbed version of the series debuted on Duronto TV in Bangladesh on October 30, 2022.

Home media

Notes

References

External links
 
 
 The Smurfs at Table of contents

Animated television series reboots
Belgian children's animated adventure television series
Belgian children's animated comedy television series
Belgian children's animated fantasy television series
Computer-animated television series
Television about magic
Television series based on Belgian comics
Television series set in the Middle Ages
TV
Wizards in television
Channel 5 (British TV channel) original programming
French-language television shows
2020s Belgian television series
2021 animated television series debuts
Ketnet original programming
La Trois original programming
TF1 original programming